Dinkoism, the Dinkoist religion, or Dinkamatham is a parody religion and social movement that emerged and evolved on social networks organized by independent welfare groups in the Indian state of Kerala. Adherents describe Dinkoism as a genuine religion.

History
According to a report in India Today, Dinkoism was established in 2008 in Kerala by a group of rationalists with the intention of ridiculing "the absurdity of blind religious faith". The community planned to become politically active. A report in The New Indian Express said Dinkoism is gaining members through Facebook. The BBC described Dinkoism in 2016 as an atheist movement with significant growth on social media.

Description

The religion purports to worship Dinkan, a comic book character. Dinkoists celebrate the character—a superhero mouse that appeared in 1983 in defunct Malayalam-language children's magazine Balamangalam—as their God for the purpose of exposing superstitions and fallacies and practices of traditional religions.

Events and protests

The concept of Dinkoism has spread through the social media but the movement has organised protest events. On January 30, 2016, a group of Dinkoists, under the banner of Mooshikasena (Rat Army) held a mock protest in front of Dhe Puttu restaurant owned by popular actor Dileep alleging his upcoming film Professor Dinkan hurt their religious sentiments, mocking similar protests happening worldwide.

Earlier Dinkoism was in news when an expatriate Dinkoist living in California obtained a license plate with the inscription DINKAN for his car, out of his devotion for Dinkan. In 2016, J. Devika wrote an article about the concept of Dinkoism and the logic of the market.

Conferences
Dinkoists of Kozhikode organised a conference at the Sports Council Hall, Mananchira on March 20, 2016. They organised a variety of entertainments with a theme of tapioca. E. A. Jabbar, a prominent rationalist, endorsed Dinkoism.

In April 2016, 25,000 Dinkoists were expected to gather for a convention called a "Dinkamatha Maha Sammelanam" to "present their rights as a minority community". Dinkoists have received threatening messages as well as opposition from believers of other religions.

See also 

 Church of the SubGenius
 Discordianism
 Dudeism
 Evolution as fact and theory
 Existence of God
 Fideism
 Flying Spaghetti Monster
 Intelligent falling
 Invisible Pink Unicorn
 Mighty Mouse
 Out Campaign
 Parody religion
 Reductio ad absurdum
 Religious satire
 Theological noncognitivism

References

External links

Agnosticism
Atheism
Freethought
Humour
Criticism of religion
Nontheism
Internet memes introduced in the 2000s
Parody religion deities
Religious parodies and satires
Indian religions
New religious movements
Religion in Kerala